Petworth  is a small town and civil parish in the Chichester District of West Sussex, England. It is located at the junction of the A272 east–west road from Heathfield to Winchester and the A283 Milford to Shoreham-by-Sea road. Some twelve miles (21 km) to the south west of Petworth along the A285 road lies Chichester and the south-coast. In 2001 the population of the parish was 2,775 persons living in 1,200 households of whom 1,326 were economically active. At the 2011 Census the population was 3,027.

History

At that time it was in the ancient hundred of Rotherbridge.

Petworth is the location of the 17th-century stately home Petworth House, the grounds of which (known as Petworth Park) were the work of Capability Brown. The house and its grounds are now owned and maintained by the National Trust.

In the early 17th century, the question of Petworth's status as an honour or a town came up when the Attorney General charged William Levett of Petworth, Gent., son of Anthony Levett, with "having unlawfully usurped divers privileges within the town of Petworth, which was parcel of the Honour of Arundel." William Levett's son Nicholas became rector of Westbourne, West Sussex. Leconfield Hall, which was formerly Petworth Town Hall, was completed in 1793.

Another historic attraction in the town, Petworth Cottage Museum in High Street, is a museum of domestic life for poor estate workers in the town in about 1910. At that time the cottage was the home of Mrs. Cummings, a seamstress, whose drunkard husband had been a farrier in the Royal Irish Hussars and on the Petworth estate.

Petworth fell victim to bombing in the Second World War on 29 September 1942, when a lone German Heinkel 111, approaching from the south over Hoes Farm, aimed three bombs at Petworth House. The bombs missed the house, but one bounced off a tree and landed on the Petworth Boys' School in North Street, killing 28 boys, the headmaster, Charles Stevenson, and assistant teacher Charlotte Marshall.

Governance
An electoral ward in the same name exists. This ward includes Fittleworth and Ebernoe with a total ward population as taken at the 2011 census of 4,742.

Transport
The railway line between Pulborough and Midhurst once had a station at Petworth, but the line was closed to passenger use in 1955, and finally to freight in 1966, though the station building survives as a bed and breakfast establishment.

Public transport access is now provided by an hourly bus between Midhurst and Worthing, operated by Stagecoach South.

Education

Petworth Primary School is the only school in the town. The school is at the south of the town and takes pupils up until Year 6. Until 2008 the Herbert Shiner School took pupils in years 6, 7 and 8 before they moved on to Midhurst Grammar School but this was closed down when the new Midhurst Rother College was opened.

Culture

The town's amateur dramatics group is known as the Petworth Players, and their past productions have included The Lion, the Witch and the Wardrobe, and The Sleeping Beauty.

In 2015 Petworth saw the launch of petfringe, a fringe festival in the style of Edinburgh Fringe or Brighton Fringe. From the start petfringe's guiding aim has been to provide a platform for 'Home Grown Talent + Guests'. petfringe 2017 runs from 29 June to 9 July.

Petworth has also been the home to the Petworth Town Band for over 100 years. A group of nearly 40 amateur brass and woodwind players, the band rehearses weekly and is often seen around the local area playing at local events.

Petworth House was one of the main locations for the 2014 Mike Leigh film Mr. Turner, which put Timothy Spall as the artist Turner in the actual locations where he painted in the early 19th century.

The Petworth Society was founded in 1974 to protect the character and amenities of the parishes of Petworth and Byworth.

Petworth Fair

On 20 November (St. Edmund's day) each year, the market square is closed off to traffic so that a fun fair can be held. This is the modern survival of an ancient custom. In earlier centuries the fair lasted several days and may have been wholly or partly held on a field on the south side of the town called fairfield. The London Gazette of November 1666 announced that a fair would not be held that year because of plague still infesting the county, and shows that the fair was then a nine-day event.

Local tradition tells of a lost charter for the fair, but this is myth because it was determined by travelling justices of King Edward I in 1275 that the fair, then lasting eight days, had already been in existence since time immemorial and no royal charter was needed. At that time tolls on stalls for the sale of cattle provided an income for the Lord of the Manor. The traders of Arundel claimed a right to sell their wares at the fair as Petworth was in the Honour of Arundel. In the 20th century the fair field was used for allotments, and is now housing and the Fairfield Medical Centre.

Hamlets
The village of Byworth in the parish is just to the east of Petworth, across the Shimmings valley.
Further east still, on the border with Fittleworth, is Egdean, which has a small church dedicated to St. Bartholomew.

Twin towns
Petworth is twinned with Ranville in Normandy, France and San Quirico d'Orcia in Tuscany, Italy.

Further reading
Beckingham, Peter, South Downs Showcase - 200 Years of Creativity around Lodsworth, Petworth and Midhurst, Lodsworth Heritage Society, 2021

References

External links

Petworth Town Council
Further historical information and sources on GENUKI

 
Towns in West Sussex
Civil parishes in West Sussex
Chichester District